The Ellison-White Conservatory of Music was a music conservatory in Portland, Oregon, United States, associated with the Ellison-White Lyceum and Chautauqua Association. The conservatory advertised itself as "answering a need" for a "Standard Conservatory of the Fine Arts" on the U.S. West Coast.

The conservatory opened in 1918 in the Broadway Building, subsequently relocating to northeast Portland. In 1927, the conservatory constructed the nine-story Studio Building in downtown Portland, after which it formally closed some time in the 1940s.

History
Founded by J.R Ellison and Clarence White, the Ellison-White Conservatory was originally located in the Broadway Building in downtown Portland, and held its first classes on September 9, 1918. The conservatory was associated with the Ellison-White Lyceum and Chautauqua Association, which had originated in Boise, Idaho.

The conservatory advertised itself as answering a need for a "Standard Conservatory of the Fine Arts" on the U.S. West Coast. By 1920, the conservatory had relocated from the Broadway Building to a location on Everett Street in northeast Portland. In 1922, the conservatory expanded its voice department. In 1927, the conservatory constructed the historic nine-story Studio Building in downtown Portland, located at SW 9th and Taylor, relocating their operations there. The Studio Building had more than 100 rehearsal studios, sound-proof walls, and was attached to the 450-seat Guild Theatre.

The conservatory was closed by the Ellison-White Lyceum and Chautauqua Association some time in 1940s after the Great Depression, though the exact date is unknown.

Notable people

Alumni
Walter Chappell, photographer
Beverley Peck Johnson, vocal coach
Helen Kleeb, actress
Jeanette Loff, film actress, singer, and organist

Faculty
Pauline Alderman, musicologist
Jacques Gershkovitch, flautist and conductor

Notes

References

Sources

External links

1918 establishments in Oregon
1940s disestablishments in Oregon
Education in Portland, Oregon
Music schools in Oregon